The Singapore National Eye Centre (SNEC) is a national eye specialty centre in Singapore.  

SNEC manages more than 380,000 patient visits and over 41,000 surgeries annually. Its services include Corneal & External Eye Disease, Cataract & Comprehensive Ophthalmology, Glaucoma, Neuro-Ophthalmology, Ocular Inflammation & Immunology, Oculoplastic, Paediatric Ophthalmology & Adult Strabismus, Refractive Surgery, and Medical & Surgical Retina.

Services
SNEC  undertakes 100% video recording of major surgeries and a full audit of outcomes, as well as the pursuit of high-impact translational research.

Key Milestones 
On 3 March 1989, SNEC was incorporated, and commenced operations in October 1990 with Professor Arthur Lim appointed as its founding medical director.  Lim was considered the ‘father of ophthalmology’ in Southeast Asia.

SNEC was officially opened in 1991 by then Health Minister, Yeo Cheow Tong.

In 1999, SNEC underwent a building extension of SGD $50 million, establishing an eight-story building consisting of two floors of outpatient clinics, 5 operating rooms, and two floors of SERI's research clinics and laboratories. 

In 2012, SNEC started a partnership with Duke-NUS that led to the creation of an ophthalmology and visual sciences academic programme.

In August 2019, the SNEC Myopia Centre was launched. This facility allows specialised management of myopia prevention, management and education.

References

External links 
 
 
 
 

Hospital buildings completed in 1990
Health specialist centres in Singapore
Hospitals established in 1990
Eye hospitals
1990 establishments in Singapore
Medical research institutes in Singapore
20th-century architecture in Singapore